The 2018 Coupe du Congo is the 54th edition of the Coupe du Congo, the knockout football competition of the Democratic Republic of the Congo.

Provincial preliminaries
The following teams qualified for the final stage from the provincial preliminaries:
Bukavu, Group A: AS Nyuki (Butembo)
Bukavu, Group B: OC Bukavu Dawa (Bukavu)
Kasaï-Katanga Playoff: AS Bantous (Mbuji-Mayi)
Kinshasa, Group A: Jeunesse Sportive (Kinshasa), FC Kungu Pemba (Kikwit)
Kinshasa, Group B: FC Renaissance du Congo (Kinshasa), TP Molunge (Mbandaka)
Kongo Central: FC Océan Pacifique (Mbuji-Mayi)

Final stage

Group A
In Mbuji-Mayi

Round 1 [Jun 28]

Kungu Pemba           0-4 JSK  

Nyuki                 1-1 AS Bantous

Round 2 [Jun 30]

AS Bantous            1-3 JSK

Nyuki                 3-2 Kungu Pemba

Round 3 [Jul 2]

JSK                   1-1 Nyuki

AS Bantous            1-2 Kungu Pemba

Final Table:

 1.Jeunesse Sportive (Kinshasa)        3   2  1  0   8- 2   7
 2.AS Nyuki (Butembo)                  3   1  2  0   5- 4   5
 - - - - - - - - - - - - - - - - - - - - - - - - - - - - - - -
 3.FC Kungu Pemba (Kikwit)             3   1  0  2   4- 8   3
 4.AS Bantous (Mbuji-Mayi)             3   0  1  2   3- 6   1

Group B
In Kinshasa

Round 1

[Jun 25]

Renaissance           1-1 Bukavu Dawa

[Jun 27]

Océan Pacifique       2-3 TP Molunge

Round 2 [Jun 29]

Bukavu Dawa           1-2 TP Molunge

Renaissance           3-0 Océan Pacifique
 
Round 3 [Jul 2]

Bukavu Dawa           1-0 Océan Pacifique

TP Molunge            0-4 Renaissance      
 
Final Table:

 1.FC Renaissance du Congo (Kinshasa)  3   2  1  0   8- 1   7
 2.TP Molunge (Mbandaka)               3   2  0  1   5- 7   6
 - - - - - - - - - - - - - - - - - - - - - - - - - - - - - - -
 3.OC Bukavu Dawa (Bukavu)             3   1  1  1   3- 3   4
 4.FC Océan Pacifique (Mbuji-Mayi)     3   0  0  3   2- 7   0

Semi-finals
[Jul 13, stade Manika, Kolwezi]

JS Kinshasa           3-0 TP Molunge            [also reported 3-1]

FC Renaissance        1-1 AS Nyuki              [2-4 pen]

Third place match
[Jul 15, stade Manika, Kolwezi]

TP Molunge            2-1 FC Renaissance

Final
[Jul 15, stade Manika, Kolwezi]

JS Kinshasa           1-2 AS Nyuki

See also
2017–18 Linafoot

References

Congo DR
Cup
Football competitions in the Democratic Republic of the Congo